The first version of this article has been based in the text of the Greek Wikipedia published under GFDL.

Athens Football Clubs Association is one of the oldest amateur Greek association football clubs associations, representing teams from Athens Prefecture.

History 
It was founded in 1924 in Athens, Greece. Founding members of the association were the teams:

 AEK Athens (of 1925)
 Goudi
 Atromitos
 Panathinaikos
 Panionios
 Apollon Athens

Organization 
The association is a member of the Hellenic Football Federation and organizes a regional football league and cup. It currently represents 900 football players and 131 amateur men's football clubs.

Twenty (20) of these football clubs are playing in national leagues. The six (6) women's football clubs of Athens F.C.A.  are playing in the first and second national league.  Sixteen (16) football clubs are playing in Hellenic Indoor Football League.

The football clubs are separated in three leagues:

Athens F.C.A. A league (32 clubs in two divisions) 
Athens F.C.A. B league (48 clubs in three divisions) 
Athens F.C.A. C league (51 clubs in four divisions)

List of Champions
1924 Apollon Athens
1925 Panathinaikos
1926 Panathinaikos
1927 Panathinaikos
1928 Atromitos
1929 Panathinaikos
1930 Panathinaikos
1931 Panathinaikos
1932 Goudi
1933 Goudi
1934 Panathinaikos
1935 Abandoned
1936 Asteras Gyzi
1937 Panathinaikos
1938 Apollon Athens
1939 Panathinaikos
1940 AEK Athens
1941 Not held
1942 Not held
1943 Not held
1944 Not held
1945 Not held
1946 AEK Athens
1947 AEK Athens
1948 Apollon Athens
1949 Panathinaikos
1950 AEK Athens
1951 Panionios
1952 Panathinaikos
1953 Panathinaikos
1954 Panathinaikos
1955 Panathinaikos
1956 Panathinaikos
1957 Panathinaikos
1958 Apollon Athens
1959 Panathinaikos
1960 Egaleo
1961 Egaleo
1962 Atromitos
1963 Ilisiakos
1964 Kalogreza
1965 Chalandri
1966 Attikos
1967 Petralona
1968 Ikaros Nea Ionia
1969 Kallithea
1970 Acharnaikos
1971 Ilisiakos
1972 Ilisiakos
1973 Asteras Zografou
1974 Thriamvos Neos Kosmos
1975 Agios Dimitrios
1976 Kallithea
1977 Agios Dimitrios
1978 Rouf
1979 Diagoras Egaleo
1980 Athinaida Kifisia
1981 Agios Ierotheos
1982 Ilioupoli
1983 Charavgiakos
1984 Marko
1985 Vouliagmeni
1986 Cholargos
1987 Akratitos
1988 Ilioupoli
1989 Keravnos Keratea
1990 Agia Eleousa
1991 Agia Eleousa
1992 Agia Paraskevi
1993 Attikos
1994 Agios Ierotheos
1995 Olympiakos Liosia
1996 Ilioupoli
1997 Akratitos
1998 Asteras Zografou
1999 Ilisiakos
2000 Agia Eleousa
2001 Ilisiakos
2002 Terpsithea
2003 Athinaida Kifisia
2004 Ilioupoli
2005 Sourmena
2006 Agii Anargyroi
2007 Paradisos Amarousiou (1st group), Olympiakos Liosia (2nd group) 
2008 A.O. Pefki (1st group), Vrilissia (2nd group)
2009 Elpidoforos Kifisia (1st group), Pera Club (2nd group)
2010 Ifestos Peristeriou
2011 A.O. Trachones
2012 Iasonas Neon Liosion (1st group), A.O. Pefki (2nd group) 
2013 Charavgiakos (1st group), Doxa Vyrona (2nd group)
2014 A.O. Chaidariou (1st group), Panerythraikos (2nd group)

Winners of the Athens Cup
1974 Koukouvaounes
1975 Ilioupoli
1976 Rouf
1977 Agios Dimitrios
1978 Ilioupoli
1979 Pagrati
1980 Athinaikos
1981 Athinaikos
1982 A.O. Peristeri
1983 Chalandri
1984 Galatsi
1985 Ifestos Peristeri
1986 Keravnos Keratea
1987 Pefki
1988 Vouliagmeni
1989 Doxa Vyronas
1990 Cholargos
1991 Kifisia
1992 Agia Paraskevi
1993 Panathinaikos (Amateur team)
1994 Panathinaikos (Amateur team)
1995 Marko
1996 Agia Eleousa
1997 Sourmena
1998 Akratitos
1999 Asteras Zografou
2000 Agios Dimitrios
2001 Thrasyvoulos
2002 Rouf
2003 Ilisiakos
2004 Chaidari
2005 Agia Paraskevi
2006 Fostiras
2007 Agia Paraskevi
2008 Agia Paraskevi

References

External links 
 Official website
 RSSSF
 Topical site / koukouvaounes
 blog / koukouvaounes

Sports organizations established in 1924
1924 establishments in Greece
Sport in Athens
Association football governing bodies in Greece